BASIC-11 was a dialect of the basic language for PDP-11 operating systems such as RSX-11, RT-11, TSX and TSX-Plus.  It was a classic BASIC in that it used line numbers, supported line number editing, and classic function syntax.  It provided extended support for user-defined functions, external sequential disk files, and linking with assembler language modules for device support and operating system interfaces.

References

BASIC programming language
PDP-11